Canadiana is a term used to describe things (e.g., books, historical documents, works of art, music and artifacts), ideas, or activities that concern or are distinctive of Canada, its people, and/or its culture, especially works of literature and other cultural products. It can also refer to the collection of such materials, such as in cultural fields like music or art. 

As a category often seen in bookstores and in research libraries, Canadiana can describe works produced in Canada (including literature and non-fiction), works about Canada, and works published outside of Canada that are of special interest or significance to Canada. More generally, the term can also include books that do not necessarily deal with Canada or Canadians themselves, but were written by Canadians or people who were Canadians at some point in their life. Two books by Canadian author Douglas Coupland—Souvenir of Canada and Souvenir of Canada 2—for example, are collections of images of pop-culture Canadiana. 

The term Canuckiana has been used (rarely), in humorous contexts, as a synonym for Canadiana.

Library system
Since 1950, one of the specific mandates of the Library and Archives Canada (LAC) has been to document the published heritage of Canada through a comprehensive bibliography—titled Canadiana: The National Bibliography of Canada.

In OCLC's WorldShare integrated library system, the Canadiana authority file contains two record types: 

 Canadiana Subject Headings In English, a list of subject headings in the English language, using controlled vocabulary, to "access and express the topic content of documents on Canada and Canadian topics." , the database contains around 2,500 subject and geographic name headings in English. When cataloguing in English, LAC uses the Library of Congress/NACO Authority File (LC/NAF). 
 Canadiana Name Authorities in French, used by LAC and other Canadian libraries when creating bibliographic descriptions in French. The database contains over 600,000 records for names, names/titles, uniform titles, and series titles.

See also

Artifacts of Canadiana 
 Bibliography of Canada
Canadian art
Canadian history
Canadian literature
 Culture of Canada
 Canuck

Similar concepts 
The suffixes -ana and -iana are commonly used in reference to a collection of things that relate to a specific place, person, etc.

Countries
 Africana – in Africa
Americana – in the United States
 Australiana – in Australia
 Filipiniana – in the Philippines
Kiwiana – in New Zealand
 Rhodesiana – in Rhodesia
Other
Johnsoniana – the sayings or writings of Samuel Johnson
Railroadiana or Railwayana – artifacts of currently or formerly operating railways around the world
Shakespeareana – the sayings or writings of William Shakespeare
Sherlockiana – material related to the fictional character Sherlock Holmes and his stories
Victoriana – items from the Victorian era

References

External links
 

 Peter Winkworth Collection of Canadiana — Canadiana art collection at Library and Archives Canada
 Canadiana.org — A non-profit, cultural NGO with the mandate to locate and preserve early printed Canadian materials. Much of this material is available in digitized format at Early Canadiana Online.
 Thisiscanadiana.com — A Canadiana blog and educational video series exploring lesser-known tales from Canadian history.
Peel's Prairie Provinces — A full-text, searchable database of digitized prairie Canadiana, including newspapers and other Western Canadian publications 
Baldwin Collection of Canadiana — Large research collection of rare books Toronto Public Library.

Canadian culture